Georget Bernier (21 September 1929 – 10 January 2005), more commonly known as Professeur Choron, was a French humorist and founder of Hara Kiri magazine.

Early years
Born in La Neuville-aux-Bois in Lorraine, Bernier was orphaned by his father at 11 years and without a proper education, he vacillated between many jobs before fighting in the Indochina Wars for 28 months. On his return he worked in the press, and rose through the ranks to take the position of sales manager of the satirical newspaper Zéro.

Éditions du Square
It was at Zéro that he met François Cavanna and Fred, with whom he founded the magazine Hara Kiri in 1960. After an initial ban, production of the magazine moved from Rue Choron to Rue de Montholon and Éditions du Square was created at its publication house.

In addition to his role of patron of Éditions du Square, Bernier also invested time in writing and photo-editing for Hara Kiri. It was during this era that he appeared on Jean-Christophe Averty's television variety show Les Raisins verts.

In 1969 the Hara Kiri team created Hara-Kiri Hebdo which shortly thereafter was renamed L’Hebdo Hara-Kiri. Other magazines published by Bernier's Editions du Square were the monthly comic Charlie Mensuel, one of the first ecological journals La Gueule ouverte, Mords-y l'œil, Surprise from designer Bernard Willem Holtrop, and Jean-Patrick Manchette's BD, l'hebdo de la BD.

1970 saw the creation of Charlie Hebdo, a weekly political newspaper for which Bernier was a regular contributor. The publication folded in 1981, but was relaunched by Cavanna and Bernier in 1993 and, as of 2011, remains in publication.

Later years
In 1988 Bernier adapted his fiches bricolages for television. He also participated in Jean-Michel Ribes' Merci Bernard. His last publications include La Mouise and Grodada, a publication for children. He also participated in several publications affiliated with Hara-Kiri, including ZOO and Yeti, as well as the launching of the periodical Zero in 1986.

In 1996, Aure Atika's interview of Jackie Berroyer for Radio Nova, at a bar's round table, degenerated into an angry exchange of words between Choron, who was sitting at the table, and Atika, with Choron denouncing her questions as "stupid" and Atika flinging the contents of her glass at him.

Personal life
Bernier was the father of the comedian Michèle Bernier. He died 10 January 2005 at Necker-Enfants Malades Hospital in Paris and was buried at Montparnasse Cemetery alongside his wife Odile Vaudelle (1934–1985). In 2008, director Pierre Carles and artist Martin released the documentary Choron Dernière in his honour.

Works 
Albums
 Boum boum badaboum le Professeur Choron chante ses chansons

Books
 Les Jeux de con du professeur Choron, Éditions du Square, 1971
 Les Fiches bricolage du professeur Choron, Éditions du Square, 1977
 L'Art vulgaire (with Gébé), Éditions du Square, 1982
 Moi, Odile, la femme a Choron; petite histoire de Hara-Kiri et Charlie Hebdo (by Christian Bobet), Editions Menges, 1983
 Les Chansons du Professeur Choron (illustrated by Philippe Vuillemin), Himalaya, 1991
 Choron et Vuillemin sexologues, Magic Strip, 1992
 Je bois, je fume et je vous emmerde, ed. Régine Deforges, 1992
 Les Jeux de con du Professeur Choron, Glénat, 1992
 Vous me croirez si vous voulez (in collaboration with Jean-Marie Gourio), Flammarion, 1993
 Y'a rien de pire que l'ignorance (in collaboration with Philippe Vuillemin), Canal+ edition, 1996
 Tout s'éclaire (in collaboration with Éric Martin), Le Dilettante, 2001 

Operettas
 Ivre-mort pour la patrie (with Philippe Vuillemin), Canal+, 1998

References

External links
Official website for Professeur Choron 
A chronicle of the film Choron Dernière 
The life and works of Professeur Choron 

1929 births
2005 deaths
French humorists
French columnists
French comedians
French comedy musicians
French satirists
French magazine founders
Analysands of René Allendy
Charlie Hebdo people
French male non-fiction writers
French comics writers
French television writers
20th-century French musicians
Male television writers
20th-century French screenwriters
20th-century French journalists
20th-century French male writers